Blerick is a city district of the Dutch municipality of Venlo. It lies on the west bank of the Meuse and its origin goes back to the Roman era as a military stronghold and settlement en route from Mosa Trajectum (Maastricht) to Noviomagus (Nijmegen). Blerick can be found on the Peutinger Table as Blariacum. Up to the second world war Blerick formed together with Baarlo and Maasbree one municipality. Under German rule Blerick became part of the municipality of Venlo.

In 2001, Blerick had 25875 inhabitants. The built-up area of the city district was 7.27 km², and contained 10866 residences.

Transportation
Blerick railway station

References

Boroughs of Venlo
Populated places in Limburg (Netherlands)